The 2009–10 LEN Euroleague was the 47th edition of Europe's premier club water polo competition. It lasted between 9 October 2009 and 15 May 2010.

Format
The Euroleague is run in five phases:
 First qualifying round, played as a single round robin tournament at the site of one of the teams competing (2 groups of 4, 2 groups of 5)
 Second qualifying round, played as a single round robin tournament at the site of one of the teams competing (4 groups of 4)
 Group (or preliminary) stage, played as a double round robin, home and away (4 groups of 4)
 Quarterfinals, played as a knockout round on aggregate, home and away
 Final four, played as a single knockout tournament at a neutral site (semifinals, third-place game, and final)

Seeding
Seeded countries

The eight countries with the best placed team in the preliminary rounds, or main group stage, in the previous year's competition, 2008–09 LEN Euroleague are seeded for this year's competition. Each seeded country earns 1 place in the main group stage, 1 place in the second qualifying round, and 1 place in the first qualifying round. These countries are:

Unseeded countries

All other countries were invited to enter up to two clubs into the first qualifying round.

Entries

First qualifying round

Group A (Šibenik)

Group B (Marseille)

Group C (Berlin)

Group D (Košice)

Second qualifying round

Group E (Eger)

Group F (Budva)

Group G (Naples)

Group G (Athens)

Preliminary round

Group A

Group B

Group C

Group D

Knockout stage

Quarter-finals
The first legs were played on 24 March, and the second legs were played on 14 April 2010.

Final Four (Naples)

Final standings

Awards

External links 
 , Ligue européenne de natation, 5 August 2008.

Notes

Champions League
2009 in water polo
2010 in water polo
LEN Champions League seasons